Maja Vodanović was born on January 20, 1968, in Croatia .  She is an artist, teacher and politician. She has been the mayor of the Montreal borough of Lachine since November 2017.

Biography 
Maja Vodanović was born in January 20, 1968, in Split, Croatia, at the time a republic part of Yugoslavia. She emigrated to Canada in 1975. She studied at McGill University where she got a B.A. in Art History in 1991 and at Concordia University where she got a Bachelor of Fine Arts in 1994.

As a painter, she has been represented by Galerie Valentin in Montreal, Galerie Yvon Desgagnés in Baie-Saint-Paul and Gevik Gallery in Toronto.

Between 1984 and 2013, she taught art to children through projects focused on knowledge of the local fauna and flora and on protection of the environment.

Politics 
Through her educational work, she was involved in creating the Alliance Jeunesse de Lachine (Lachine Youth Alliance) for the purpose of increasing the participation of young people in democracy.

Maja Vodanović was elected borough councillor for the Canal District of Lachine in 2013, as candidate for the party of the incumbent mayor, Claude Dauphin.

In 2016, she disagreed with the way urban planning and contaminated soils were managed in the Lachine-Est zone and left the party of Claude Dauphin. In January 2017, she joined Projet Montréal and announced she would be candidate for the position of borough mayor.

In November 2017, Maja Vodanović was elected mayor of the borough of Lachine with 39,57% of the votes. Following the election, she was nominated member of the executive committee of the Communauté métropolitaine de Montréal and representative of the CMM to the National Zero Waste Council of Canada where she sits on the Management Board and is the co-chair of the plastic advisory panel.

At the November 7th, 2021 general election, Maja Vodanović was reelected with 62,21 % of the votes.  On November 24th, she was nominated by the Mayor of Montreal to the Executive Committee with responsibility for water and coordination between boroughs and delegate to the Great Lakes and Saint Lawrence Cities Initiative, where she was elected to the 2022-2023 Board of directors.

External links 

 Personal website

References

Living people
Montreal city councillors
Mayors of places in Quebec
Women mayors of places in Quebec
People from Lachine, Quebec
21st-century Canadian politicians
21st-century Canadian women politicians
1968 births